Dixeia, commonly called the small whites, is a genus of butterflies of the subfamily Pierini in the family Pieridae that are found mainly in Africa.

They are not to be confused with the cabbage white butterfly, Pieris rapae, which is referred to as the "small white" in several European nations.

Species
Listed alphabetically:
Dixeia capricornus (Ward, 1871)
Dixeia cebron Ward, 1871
Dixeia charina (Boisduval, [1836]) – African small white
Dixeia dixeyi (Neave, 1904)
Dixeia doxo (Godart, [1819]) – black-veined white
Dixeia leucophanes Vári, 1976
Dixeia orbona (Geyer, 1837)
Dixeia pigea (Boisduval, 1836) – ant-heap white or ant-heap small white
Dixeia piscicollis Pinhey, 1972
Dixeia spilleri (Spiller, 1884) – Spiller's (sulphur) yellow or Spiller's canary white

References

Seitz, A. Die Gross-Schmetterlinge der Erde 13: Die Afrikanischen Tagfalter. Plate XIII 14

Pierini
Pieridae genera
Taxa named by George Talbot (entomologist)